Patrick Joseph Sullivan (March 17, 1864April 8, 1935) was an American politician. He was the mayor of Casper, Wyoming from 1897 to 1898 and was a Republican member of the United States Senate from Wyoming from 1929 to 1930.

Biography
Sullivan was born on a farm at Kilcrohane, west of Bantry, County Cork, Ireland. He emigrated to America in 1888, landed in New York City, and moved to the Territory of Wyoming where he raised sheep in Rawlins. He moved to Casper in 1892, and became interested in banking, the production of oil, and various other enterprises.

He was a member of the Wyoming House of Representatives from 1894 until 1896, and from 1898 until 1900. He served as the mayor of Casper from 1897 until 1899. In 1912 and 1916 he was a delegate to the Republican National Convention from Wyoming. He was a member of the Republican National Committee from Wyoming in 1924.

On December 5, 1929 he was appointed as a Republican to the United States Senate to fill the vacancy caused by the death of Francis E. Warren. He served in the US Senate from December 5, 1929, to November 30, 1930, when Robert D. Carey succeeded him. He was not a candidate for the election to fill the vacancy.

Death
Sullivan died on April 8, 1935 in Santa Barbara, California. He is interred in Highland Cemetery in Casper, Wyoming.

References

External links

Govtrack.us
The Political Graveyard
Baptism record (28 March 1864 - Muintervara Parish)

1865 births
1935 deaths
Irish emigrants to the United States (before 1923)
Mayors of places in Wyoming
Republican Party members of the Wyoming House of Representatives
People from Bantry
Politicians from Casper, Wyoming
Politicians from County Cork
Republican Party United States senators from Wyoming